Golkhaneh may refer to:
 Golkhaneh, Afghanistan
 Golkhaneh, Iran